Starokizganovo (İśke Kiźgän) is a rural locality (a village) in Tazlarovsky Selsoviet, Burayevsky District, Bashkortostan, Russia. The population was 157 as of 2010. There are six streets.

Geography 
Starokizganovo is located 26 km northeast of Burayevo (the district's administrative centre) by road. Novokizganovo is the nearest rural locality.

References 

Rural localities in Burayevsky District